In Greek mythology, Dymas was a Phrygian king.

Mythology 
The father of Dymas was given as one Eioneus, son of Proteus, by some ancient mythographers. According to Dictys, he was a descendant of Phoenix, son of Agenor, as recounted by Helen to Hecuba to prove their kinship. Dymas' wife was called as Eunoë, a daughter of the river god Sangarius. In fact, Dymas and his Phrygian subjects are closely connected to the River Sangarius, which empties into the Black Sea.

By his wife Eunoë or the naiad Evagora, Dymas was the father of Hecuba (also called Hecabe), wife to King Priam of Troy. King Dymas is also said by Homer to have had a son named Asius, who fought (and died) during the Trojan War - not to be confused with his namesake, Asius son of Hyrtacus, who also fought (and died) before Troy. The scholiasts credited Dymas with another son, named Otreus, who fought the Amazons a generation before the Trojan War.

The etymology of the name Dymas is obscure, although it is probably non-Hellenic.

Notes

References 

 Apollodorus, The Library with an English Translation by Sir James George Frazer, F.B.A., F.R.S. in 2 Volumes, Cambridge, MA, Harvard University Press; London, William Heinemann Ltd. 1921. ISBN 0-674-99135-4. Online version at the Perseus Digital Library. Greek text available from the same website.
Dictys Cretensis, from The Trojan War. The Chronicles of Dictys of Crete and Dares the Phrygian translated by Richard McIlwaine Frazer, Jr. (1931-). Indiana University Press. 1966. Online version at the Topos Text Project.
 Homer, The Iliad with an English Translation by A.T. Murray, Ph.D. in two volumes. Cambridge, MA., Harvard University Press; London, William Heinemann, Ltd. 1924. . Online version at the Perseus Digital Library.
Homer, Homeri Opera in five volumes. Oxford, Oxford University Press. 1920. . Greek text available at the Perseus Digital Library.
 Quintus Smyrnaeus, The Fall of Troy translated by Way. A. S. Loeb Classical Library Volume 19. London: William Heinemann, 1913. Online version at theio.com
 Quintus Smyrnaeus, The Fall of Troy. Arthur S. Way. London: William Heinemann; New York: G.P. Putnam's Sons. 1913. Greek text available at the Perseus Digital Library.

Kings of Phrygia
Kings in Greek mythology